The 1979 Gator Bowl was a college football bowl game played on December 28, 1979.  The North Carolina Tar Heels of the Atlantic Coast Conference defeated the Michigan Wolverines of the Big Ten Conference, 17–15.

Background
An 8-1 start (With a loss to #9 Notre Dame) had propelled Michigan to being ranked 10th in the polls, before a loss to #14 Purdue followed by a loss to #2 Ohio State at home made them fall to 14th in the polls and finish 3rd in the Big Ten Conference. The Tar Heels had started 4-0 and were ranked #14 before a loss to Wake Forest started a 1-3-1 middle stretch that ended with victories over Virginia and Duke to make them finish 5th in the Atlantic Coast Conference. This was Michigan's first Gator Bowl appearance. This was North Carolina's third ever Gator Bowl appearance.

Scoring summary

First quarter
 No score

Second quarter
 Michigan - Virgil, 20-yard field goal
 Michigan - Anthony Carter, 53-yard pass from John Wangler (kick failed)
 North Carolina - Doug Paschal, 1-yard run (Hayes kick)

Third quarter
 North Carolina - Phil Farris 12-yard pass from Matt Kupec (Hayes kick)

Fourth quarter
 North Carolina - Hayes 32-yard field goal
 Michigan - Anthony Carter 30-yard pss from B. J. Dickey (B.J. Dickey pass failed)

References

External links
 Summary at Bentley Historical Library, University of Michigan Athletics History

Gator Bowl
Gator Bowl
Michigan Wolverines football bowl games
North Carolina Tar Heels football bowl games
20th century in Jacksonville, Florida
December 1979 sports events in the United States
1979 in sports in Florida